Stillaguamish can refer to:

 Stillaguamish people, a Coast Salish people of Washington
 Stillaguamish Tribe of Indians of Washington, a federally recognized tribe

Places
Stillaguamish River
Stillaguamish Reservation, Washington